Norval may refer to:

Norv Turner, American football coach, currently the offensive coordinator for the Carolina Panthers
Norval E. Welch, American colonel during the American Civil War
Norval, Ontario, Canada
A trade name for the psychoactive drug Mianserin
The main character in the 1756 play Douglas by John Home